Allama Iqbal Open University is a public university in Islamabad, Pakistan. 
It is named after Allama Iqbal.
The university is the world's second largest institution of higher learning, with an annual enrollment of 1,121,038 students, the majority are women and course enrollment of 3,305,948 (2011). Students can gain admission in Matriculation, Intermediate, Bachelor, Master, MPhil and Ph.D. programmes at the university.

The university has 44 regional campuses and centers throughout Pakistan including in Faisalabad Millat Road, Multan, Dera Ghazi Khan, Dera Ismail Khan, Bahawalpur and Rahim Yar Khan.

Objectives and mission
Established in 1974, it is Asia's first open university with a strong emphasis on providing distance education in philosophy, natural science and social sciences. It has the most applicants per year of any university in Pakistan.

AIOU offers extensive undergraduate and post-graduate programs in academic disciplines. After witnessing the success of the Open University in the United Kingdom, AIOU was established as a public university in 1974.

AIOU is noted for its cost-effective policy to provide higher and lifelong education to people learning from their homes and places of work at a minimum cost through a specialized fund managed by the government.

AIOU is open to everyone and provides education to all without any discrimination.

Administration and governance
 Chancellor (President of Pakistan)
 Pro-Chancellor (Federal Minister for Education, Ministry of Federal Education and Professional Training)
 Vice-Chancellor (Chief Executive Officer/Head of the institution)
 Executive Council (Governing Body)

Faculties and departments

Faculty of Arabic and Islamic Studies
Established in 1974, the faculty was upgraded as the Faculty of Arabic and Islamic Studies in 1998, with the following departments:
 Arabic Language and Literature 
 Hadith and Seerah 
 Islamic Law (Fiqh) 
 Islamic Thought, History and Culture 
 Qur'an and Tafseer
The Faculty of Arabic and Islamic Studies also operates an Indexing and Abstracting Agency "Islamic Research Index". The Islamic Research Index is the first and largest repository of Arabic and Islamic Studies Research Journals.

Faculty of Education
Established in 1984, the Faculty of Education's origin predates the university. A National Institute of Education was established in 1973 as a part of the Federal Ministry of Education, to improve education at school levels through in-service training of Master Trainers. This institute became a part of the university in June 1975.

The Faculty of Education has the following departments:
 Adult and Continuing Education 
 Distance and Non-Formal Education 
 Educational Planning and Management 
 Science Education 
 Special Education 
 Teacher Education (Secondary) 
 Teacher Education (Elementary)

Faculty of Sciences
Renamed as Faculty of Sciences, the Faculty of Basic and Applied Sciences was established in 1982. It comprises the following nine departments:
 Agricultural Sciences 
 Biology
 Botany
 Chemistry
 Information Technology
 Computer Science
 Engineering and Technology 
 Environmental Sciences 
 Home and Health Sciences 
 Mathematics and Statistics 
 Physics
 Telecommunications

Faculty of Social Sciences and Humanities
The Faculty of Social Sciences and Humanities was established in 1982. The 16 departments of the faculty are: 
 Business Administration
 Management Sciences
 Commerce
 Economics
 English Language and Applied Linguistics
 History
 Iqbal Studies
 Library and information sciences
 Mass Communication
 Pakistan Studies
 Pakistani languages
 Sociology, Social Work and Population Studies
 Gender and Women's Studies

Future goals of AIOU
 BS (4-Years) Specialization in Distance
 Non-Formal and Continuing Education
 Postgraduate Diploma in Educational Technology
 Postgraduate Diplomas in Distance Education
 Postgraduate Diplomas in Non-Formal Education

Commemorative postage stamp
On the university's 25th anniversary, Pakistan Post issued a commemorative postage stamp for it on 20 November 1999.

References

External links

1974 establishments in Pakistan
Distance education institutions based in Pakistan
Allama Iqbal Open University
Educational institutions established in 1974
Islamabad Capital Territory
Memorials to Muhammad Iqbal